Smithflat (formerly, Smith's Flat, Smiths Flat, and Smith Flat) is an unincorporated community in El Dorado County, California, United States. It lies 4 km (2.5 mi) east of Placerville and 7.2 km (4.5 mi) west of Camino at an elevation of 2224 feet (678 m).

The Smith's Flat post office opened in 1876 and was renamed to Smithflat in 1895. The name honors Jeb Smith, a rancher who settled here early.

References

Unincorporated communities in California
Unincorporated communities in El Dorado County, California